KWO may refer to:

Obrigheim Nuclear Power Plant (Kernkraftwerk Obrigheim)
Kraftwerke Oberhasli, Swiss company
KWO Berlin, football club
KWO, Overwatch Player 
Kojima World Order